Isa Kandi (also Romanized as ‘Īsá Kandī; also known as Qarah Dāghlī) is a village in Chaybasar-e Shomali Rural District, Bazargan District, Maku County, West Azerbaijan Province, Iran. At the 2006 census, its population was 385, in 66 families.

References 

Populated places in Maku County